"Paramesorhizobium"  is a provisional genus of bacteria from the family Phyllobacteriaceae with one known species ("Paramesorhizobium deserti").

References

Phyllobacteriaceae
Bacteria genera
Monotypic bacteria genera